Jeffrey and Sloth is a Canadian children's book by Kari-Lynn Winters and Ben Hodson. It was published in March 2007 by Orca Book Publishers.

Jeffrey and Sloth first appeared in a 2004 issue of Chameleon, a children's magazine published by the University of British Columbia, as "Jeffrey's Wor(l)ds Meet Sloth". Orca selected this book as one of 9 out of 1600 manuscripts chosen for publication in 2007. The book has come to life beyond the page, as a literacy play performed by Tickle Trunk Players in schools in Vancouver, Calgary, and Toronto.

Awards
 Finalist: 2008 BC Book Prize  (Christie Harris Illustrated Children's Literature Prize) and sponsored tour
 Winner: 2009 Chocolate Lilly British Columbia Reader's Choice Award, Silver Medal
 Winner: ABCs of Education best books of 2006-2007
 Nominated: 2008 BLUE SPRUCE Ontario Library Association award

Plot

Jeffrey can't think of how to start his writing assignment so he doodles instead, only to have his doodle of a sloth come to life and order him about. Jeffrey struggles against the strong-willed Sloth, in the process telling a tale and completing his homework.

References

External links
Published reviews of Jeffrey and Sloth
Orca Book Publishers page on Jeffrey and Sloth
"Jeffrey's Wor(l)ds Meet Sloth" (2004, illustrated by Oana Capota, Chameleon, 2:1, 24-28) at Educational Insights
Kari-Lynn Winters personal page
Ben Hodson personal page
Tickle Trunk Players

Children's fiction books
Canadian children's books
Canadian picture books
Fictional sloths and anteaters
2007 children's books